Ferguson Lake may refer to:

Canada
 Hector Ferguson Lake, British Columbia
 Nunavut
 Ferguson Lake (Kivalliq Region)
 Tahiryuaq formerly known as Ferguson Lake
 Nova Scotia
 Ferguson Lake (Nova Scotia), Cape Breton Regional Municipality
 Ontario
Nipissing District
 Ferguson Lake (Stewart Township)
 Ferguson Lake (Temagami)
 Ferguson Lake (Sudbury District)

Greenland
 Ferguson Lake (Tasersuatsiaq)

United States
 Ferguson Lake, Pulaski County, Arkansas
 Ferguson Lake, Searcy County, Arkansas
 Ferguson Lake, southwest Arizona
 Ferguson Lake, California
 Ferguson Lake, Pasco County, Florida
 Ferguson Lake, Penobscot County, Maine
 Ferguson Lake, Michigan
 Ferguson Lake, Montana
 Ferguson Lake, Colfax County, New Mexico 
 Ferguson Lake, Westchester County, New York
 Ferguson Lake, Allendale County, South Carolina
 Ferguson Lake, Texas
 Ferguson Lake, Washington
 Ferguson Lake, Douglas County, Wisconsin 
 Lake Ferguson, Mississippi